Judith Joan Young (born 16 January 1966) is an Australian Paralympic swimmer.  She was born in Melbourne. Young, who  has a birth defect in her arm, was one of the first people to receive an Australian Institute of Sport Athletes with a Disability residential scholarship, from 1993 to 1996. She was coached by Peter Freney with assistance from Jim Fowlie.

At the 1988 Seoul Games, she won two gold medals in the Women's 100 m Backstroke A8 and Women's 400 m Freestyle A8 events, and three silver medals in the Women's 100 m Butterfly L6,  Women's 100 m Breaststroke A8 and  Women's 200 m Individual Medley L6 events.   At the Games, Young faced a protest over her below-the-elbow amputee classification because of the degree of use she received from her arm with the birth defect. The appeal was successful and Young was classified as les autres. She was allowed to keep her three A8 medals, but the two world records set were nullified.

Young won two gold medals, three silver medals, and a bronze medal at the 1990 World Championships and Games for the Disabled in Assen, the Netherlands.

At the 1992 Barcelona Games, Young won a silver medal in the Women's 50 m Freestyle S10 event and two bronze medals in the Women's 100 m Butterfly S10 and Women's 200 Individual Medley SM10 events.  She competed in four other events. At the 1996 Atlanta Games, she won three silver medals in the Women's 100 m Breaststroke SB10, Women's 100 m Butterfly S10 and Women's 50 m Freestyle S10 events and a bronze medal in the Women's 100 m Backstroke S10 event.

References

1966 births
Living people
Swimmers from Melbourne
Female Paralympic swimmers of Australia
Swimmers at the 1988 Summer Paralympics
Swimmers at the 1992 Summer Paralympics
Swimmers at the 1996 Summer Paralympics
Medalists at the 1988 Summer Paralympics
Medalists at the 1992 Summer Paralympics
Medalists at the 1996 Summer Paralympics
Paralympic gold medalists for Australia
Paralympic silver medalists for Australia
Paralympic bronze medalists for Australia
Les Autres category Paralympic competitors
Australian Institute of Sport Paralympic swimmers
Sportswomen from Victoria (Australia)
Paralympic medalists in swimming
Australian female freestyle swimmers
Australian female backstroke swimmers
Australian female breaststroke swimmers
Australian female butterfly swimmers
Australian female medley swimmers
S10-classified Paralympic swimmers
Medalists at the World Para Swimming Championships
20th-century Australian women
21st-century Australian women